Spork is a locality of the town of Bocholt in the district of Borken. It was first mentioned in 1188 as Sporklo. Formerly an independent municipality, it was merged into the city of Bocholt in 1975. Its population was 972 in December 2017.

References

Bocholt, Germany